Plioplateia is a genus of crustaceans belonging to the monotypic family Plioplateidae.

The species of this genus are found in South African Republic.

Species:

Plioplateia nodiformis 
Plioplateia triquetra

References

Amphipoda